Joaquín Jaime Verdugo Salazar (born 7 October 1996) is a Chilean footballer who plays as a midfielder for Deportes Concepción in the Segunda División Profesional de Chile.

References

External links
 

1996 births
Living people
People from Talca
Chilean footballers
Rangers de Talca footballers
C.D. Huachipato footballers
Deportes Concepción (Chile) footballers
Chilean Primera División players
Primera B de Chile players
Segunda División Profesional de Chile players
Association football midfielders